The Sony Xperia 1 III is an Android smartphone manufactured by Sony. Designed to be the new flagship of Sony's Xperia series, the phone was announced along with the compact flagship Xperia 5 III and the mid-range Xperia 10 III on April 14, 2021.

Design
The Xperia 1 III improves on the design used on its predecessor, the Xperia 1 II. It now features a matte frame and slightly smaller bezels all around. The phone has Corning Gorilla Glass Victus protection on the front and Corning Gorilla Glass 6 on the back with a frosted glass finish as well as IP65 and IP68 certifications for water resistance. The build has a pair of symmetrical bezels on the top and the bottom, where the front-facing dual stereo speakers and the front camera are placed. The left side of the phone contains the SIM card tray and microSD card slot, while the right side contains a fingerprint reader embedded into the power button, a volume rocker, a customisable shortcut button, and a shutter button with an embossed finish. The rear cameras are arranged in a vertical strip like its predecessor. The phone will be available in three colors: Frosted Black, Frosted Gray, and Frosted Purple.

Specifications

Hardware
The Xperia 1 III has a Qualcomm Snapdragon 888 SoC and an Adreno 660 GPU, accompanied by  12GB of RAM, 256 GB storage space (which can be expanded up to 1 TB via the microSD card slot), and single/dual-hybrid nano-SIM card slot depending on region. The phone features a 21:9, world's first CinemaWide 4K HDR 10-bit 120Hz OLED display in a smartphone. The phone has a 4500 mAh battery, and supports 30W Fast Charging alongside Qi wireless charging with reverse wireless charging support. The phone has front-facing dual stereo speakers with support for 360 Reality Audio, which Sony claims is now 40% louder than the predecessor. There is also a 3.5 mm audio jack up top just like its predecessor.

The Japanese carrier and SIM-unlocked versions of the Xperia 1 III support the Japanese mobile payment standard Osaifu-Keitai in conjunction with the Sony-developed mobile smart card standard Mobile FeliCa as well as regular NFC, however, unlike the vast majority of carrier-branded flagship Android phones sold in Japan, the Xperia 1 III does not support the 1seg mobile television standard.

Camera 
The phone has a triple 12 MP camera setup and a 3D iToF sensor on the back, and an 8 MP camera on the front. The rear cameras comprise the main lens (24 mm f/1.7), the ultra wide angle lens (16 mm f/2.2), and the world's first variable periscope telephoto lens that can switch between 70mm and 105mm; all of which use ZEISS' T✻ (T-Star) anti-reflective coating. Digital zoom can now reach the equivalent of 300mm, compared to 200mm on the Xperia 1 II and 5 II with a new enhanced algorithm which Sony calls "AI super resolution zoom". The phone still has support for 4K video recording for up to 120 FPS and 2K for up to 120 FPS like its predecessor. Sony introduced "Realtime Tracking" which now allows users to tap on a subject and have the phone continuously track it without ever losing focus of what is important.

Software
The Xperia 1 III runs on Android 11. It is also equipped with a "Photo Pro" mode developed by Sony's camera division α (Alpha) and a "Cinema Pro" mode developed by Sony's cinematography division CineAlta, just like its predecessor. The old camera app has been integrated with "Photo Pro" and was renamed as "Basic Mode".Updates are provided for two years..

Color

Reception
The Xperia 1 III has been described by Engadget as a "love letter to photography nerds" because of its camera features.

Notes

References

Android (operating system) devices
Flagship smartphones
Sony smartphones
Mobile phones introduced in 2021
Mobile phones with multiple rear cameras
Mobile phones with 4K video recording